Segura (or  ) is a medium-sized river in southeastern Spain. It has its source in the Sierra de Segura.

Course
The river begins at Santiago Pontones (province of Jaén), passes Calasparra, Cieza, Blanca, Murcia, Beniaján (Region of Murcia), Orihuela, Rojales and flows into the Mediterranean Sea near Guardamar del Segura in the province of Alicante. Some of its tributaries are the Mundo (which starts near Riópar), the Alhárabe (which starts in Moratalla), the Mula and the Guadalentín.

The alluvial plain is called the Vega del Segura and is a very productive agricultural region growing a wide variety of fruit, vegetables and flowers.  The Vegas are divided into three areas: Alta, Media and Baja (upper, medium, and lower).

Affluents
The Segura's main tributaries or affluents are:

Right bank:
 Zumeta
 River Taibilla, 2,95 m³/s
 River Alhárabe, 0,20 m³/s
 Río Benamor
 Río Argos, 0,50 m³/s
 Río Quípar, 0,79 m³/s
 River Mula, 5,10 m³/s
 River Pliego
 Rambla Salada
 River Guadalentín, also called Sangonera or Regueron, 1,35 m³/s
 Rambla Bosch
 Rambla Nogalte
 River Luchena
 River Turrilla
 Rambla Torrealvilla

Left bank:
 River Madera
 River Tus, 0,15 m³/s
 River Mundo, 20,42 m³/s
 River Bogarra
 Rambla Judío
 Rambla Moro
 Rambla Tinajón
 Rambla Abanilla

Recovery

By the 1990s, the Segura had become one of the most polluted rivers in Europe, due to the canning industry and urban and agricultural residues originating in the densely populated area in the medium and lower areas of the basin. This fact combined with low or extreme low flows in the same areas –the agricultural use of water and summer drought could reduce the mean discharge to just around 2 to 3 m/s in Murcia city– made it more difficult to dilute pollutants.

Public outcry peaked in 2001, with a demonstration gathering 40,000 people. A comprehensive action plan followed, the Segura River Project, developed by the Murcia Government's Regional Water Department, in partnership with the Segura River Authority (CHS) and town councils in the region, to restore the health of the Segura River and to supply reclaimed water to the booming agriculture industry. Between 2001 and 2010, 100 water treatment plants and 350 kilometres of wastewater collection systems were built. In addition, a wastewater reclamation levy was established to finance the operation, maintenance and monitoring of these systems, applying the principle "the polluter pays".

By 2003 the quality of the Segura's water started improving. Since 2010, pollution has been unnoticeable, leading to the recovery of fauna and flora including increased otter population in parts of the river they had once abandoned. Birds now rest at two recovered wetland areas recognised by the Ramsar Convention, during their migration between Europe and Africa. In addition, around 110 million m of reclaimed water is reused annually for agriculture in the region.

With the river coming back to life, by 2013, otters and eels –both species particularly sensitive to water pollutants– had repopulated large tracts of the river where they had been absent for decades.

As of 2015 the Segura River Project is a finalist for the 2016 European Riverprize Awards, organized by the International River Foundation. This recognizes the fact that the Segura went from being one of the most polluted major rivers in Europe to being the Spanish river with the lowest average pollution (considering the average of all tracts of the river) in the span of just one decade.

Average discharge

Floods
The Segura is usually in a state of semi-permanent drought, however, now and then, it does occasionally flood as the consequence of the torrential rains (cold drop), which typically take place once every 6–9 years approximately, always in Autumn and Spring.

The Guadalentín river, a tributary of the Segura, is the wildest European river.

In the twentieth century significant flooding occurred in 1946, 1948, 1973, 1982, 1987 and 1989. Since 1990 the lower reaches of the river have been canalized, removing meanders and hence improving the evacuation of flood waters.  The new canal was put to the test in September 1997, in October 2000, in December 2016 and September 2019, when heavy rainfall resulted in significant runoff.

Segura floods in Murcia and Orihuela

Flora and Fauna
The predominant flora in the river Segurar is the riverine forest, abundant in Murcia, made up of trees and shrubs such as willows, reed beds, cumbungis and reeds near the river. A little further from the riverbed are the wild rose bushes and elm trees.

And finally, in the middle strip, there are brambles, white poplars, other poplars and tarays.

Regarding its fauna, there are otters, eels, barbel and trout; as for the birds, the eagles, the owls, the kingfisher, the nightingale, the white-throated dipper and the wagtail; bats and galapagos.

See also 
 List of rivers of Spain
 Sierras de Cazorla, Segura y Las Villas Natural Park
 Arroyo (creek)
 Basin
 Drowning
 Flash flood
 Flood
 Flood protection
 Irrigation district
 Saltwater intrusion
 Transvasement
 La Vicaria Arch Bridge
 Water pollution
 Water stress

References

External links

 Segura's river basin body "Confederación Hidrográfica del Segura" 
 Chronology of the main floods occurred in the river basin, beginning with Santa Teresa flood. 

Rivers of Spain
Murcia
Rivers of Andalusia
Floods in Spain
Water in Spain
Rivers of the Valencian Community